Daughter of the Jungle (/ Encounter in the Last Paradise)  is a 1982 Italian romantic adventure film directed by Umberto Lenzi and starring Sabrina Siani.

Plot 
Ringo and Butch, young Americans who intend to explore the Dominican Republic's forest, rent a boat and venture out on a large river. Lost their way, after ending up in a rapid, they are captured by a tribe of indigenous people, who are then attacked by some adventurers in search of rubies. Ringo and Butch escape to safety by escaping with Susan, a blonde girl who grew up in the jungle since she was a child in a plane crash. Ringo then finds an old, half-destroyed helicopter, which belonged to Susan's parents, and manages to repair it. Helped the natives to chase away the violent adventurers, they leave for the United States together with Susan, with whom Butch has fallen in love, with the rubies stolen from the criminals.

Cast 
Sabrina Siani as  Luana/Susan
  Rodolfo Bigotti as  Ringo
 Renato Miracco as  Butch
Sal Borgese as  Dupré
Mario Pedone

See also        
 List of Italian films of 1982

References

External links

Films directed by Umberto Lenzi
Italian adventure films
1980s adventure films
Films about castaways
Films about survivors of seafaring accidents or incidents
1982 romantic comedy films
1982 films
Italian romantic comedy films
1980s teen romance films
1980s Italian-language films
1980s Italian films